Crime scene investigation may refer to:

 Forensic inspection of a crime scene
 CSI: Crime Scene Investigation (2000-2015), a US television series
 CSI: Crime Scene Investigation (video game), a 2003 videogame based on the TV show
 CSI (franchise), aka Crime Scene Investigation; a US TV franchise, including CSI (2000-2015)

See also
 Crime scene investigator
 CSI (disambiguation)